Attolico is a surname. Notable people with the surname include:

Francesco Attolico (born 1963), Italian athlete
Baron Bernardo Attolico (1880–1942), Italian diplomat, ambassador to Germany 1935–40

Italian-language surnames